Villa La Palestine is a historic mansion in Marseille, Bouches-du-Rhône, France. It was built from 1902 to 1905 for Pierre Leclerc. It has been listed as an official historical monument since November 16, 1993.

References

Houses completed in 1905
Monuments historiques of Marseille
1905 establishments in France
20th-century architecture in France